Amos Shapira (עמוס שפירא; born 1949) is an Israeli former President of El Al Airlines, Cellcom, and the University of Haifa.

Biography
Shapira is a sixth-generation Israeli. His grandfather was an Orthodox rabbi in the agricultural settlement of Yesud HaMa'ala in the Hula Valley in Northern Israel.

Shapira earned his B.A. in economics from the University of Haifa in 1980, and his MA in industrial management from the Technion – Israel Institute of Technology.

Shapira was President and CEO of El Al Airlines from 2003 to 2005, and then of Cellcom (appointed in 2005), Israel's largest cellular provider.

He then was made President of the University of Haifa, beginning in October 2012.

References 

Living people
University of Haifa alumni
Technion – Israel Institute of Technology alumni
Academic staff of the University of Haifa
Presidents of universities in Israel
21st-century Israeli businesspeople
1949 births